Lakshman Mallick also spelt Laxman is an Indian politician. He was elected to the Lok Sabha, the lower house of the Parliament of India as a member of the Indian National Congress.

References

External links
Official biographical sketch in Parliament of India website

1927 births
2014 deaths
Lok Sabha members from Odisha
Indian National Congress politicians
India MPs 1980–1984
India MPs 1984–1989